This is a list of the extreme points of Europe: the geographical points that are higher or farther north, south, east or west than any other location in Europe. Some of these positions are open to debate, as the definition of Europe is diverse.

Extremes of the European continent, including islands

Northernmost point. Cape Fligely, Rudolf Island, Franz Josef Land, Russia (81° 48′ 24″ N). Franz Josef Land is near the ill-defined border between Europe and Asia; if it is not considered a part of Europe, then the northernmost point is on the island of Rossøya, Svalbard, Norway (81°N).
Southernmost point. Cape Trypiti, Gavdos Island, Greece (34° 48′ 02″ N) is the least ambiguous southernmost point of Europe. However, there are other contenders, depending on definition. The island of Cyprus has cultural links with Europe and it is also part of European Union; Cyprus's southernmost point is the British base at Akrotiri (34°35′N). The Portuguese islands of Madeira are borderline between Europe and Africa; their southernmost point is the Savage Islands (30°8′43″N). La Restinga on the island of El Hierro (27°45′N) in the Spanish Canary Islands is yet further south and could be considered politically, though not physiographically as part of Europe.
Westernmost point. Monchique Islet, Azores Islands, Portugal (31° 16′ 30″ W) (If considered part of Europe, though it sits on the North American Plate). If not, then the Capelinhos Volcano, Faial Island, Azores Islands, Portugal (28° 50′ 00″ W), the westernmost point of the Eurasian Plate above sea level.
Easternmost point. Cape Flissingsky (69° 02′ E), Severny Island, Novaya Zemlya, Russia.

Mainland Europe
Northernmost point. Cape Nordkinn (Kinnarodden), Norway (71°08′02″N 27°39′00″E)
Southernmost point. Punta de Tarifa, Spain (36° 00′ 15″ N)
Westernmost point. Cabo da Roca, Portugal (9°29'56.44 W).
Easternmost point. The easternmost point is dependent upon the various definitions of Europe's eastern border. This peak is 17 km northeast of an 875-metre peak named Gora Anoraga and 60 km southwest of Ostrov Lediyev (island) on Arctic waters south of the Kara Sea.

Elevation
Highest point. The highest point is dependent upon the definition of Europe:
The Caucasus Mountains watershed divide is the most common definition for the European/Asian border. This places the highest point at Mount Elbrus, Russia (5,642 metres; 18,506 feet), which is 11 km onto the European side of the Caucasus watershed divide.
If the Caucasus mountains are excluded, the highest point is Mont Blanc, on the border between France and Italy (4,810 metres; 15,781 feet).
Lowest point (natural, with open sky). Caspian Sea shore, Russia (28 metres; 92 feet below sea level).
Lowest point (natural, under water). Calypso Deep, Ionian Sea, Greece (5,267 metres; 17,280 feet below sea level).
Lowest point (natural, underground). Dependent upon the definition of Europe: either Krubera Cave, Abkhazia, Georgia (2196 metres; 7205 feet below surface) (also the deepest cave in the world) or Lamprechtsofen, Austria (1,632 metres; 5,354 feet below surface).
Lowest point (artificial, with open sky). Hambach surface mine (open-pit mine), Germany (293 metres; 961 feet below sea level). Also deepest of the world.
Lowest point (artificial, underground). Kola Superdeep Borehole, Russia (12,262 metres; 40,230 feet below surface). Also the deepest artificial point on Earth.

Highest attainable by transportation
Cable car (and lift) – Klein Matterhorn, Switzerland (3,883 metres; 12,736 feet)
Funicular – Mittelallalin, Switzerland (3,456 metres; 11,339 feet)
Train (dead end) – Jungfraujoch, Switzerland (3,454 metres; 11,330 feet)
Train (mountain pass) – Bernina Pass, Switzerland (2,253 metres; 7390 feet)
Restricted access paved road (dead end) – Veleta (Sierra Nevada), Spain (3,300 metres; 10,827 feet)
Paved road (dead end) – Ötztal Glacier Road, Austria (2,830 metres; 9,285 feet)
Paved road (mountain pass) – Col de l'Iseran, France (2,770 metres; 9,090 feet)
See also: List of highest paved roads in Europe and List of highest railways in Europe

Lowest attainable by transportation
Lowest public tunnel – Ryfast Tunnel, Norway ( below sea level)

Extreme points attainable by train

Extreme station of the European continent, including islands
Northernmost station: Terminal station: unclear which is in service: Pechenga (railway station), Murmansk Oblast, Murmansk Oblast, Russia (274 kilometers from North Cape)
Easternmost station:  Crossing of the watershed border of the Ural: Polyarnyj Ural station, literally named after the region of Polar Urals, Komi Republic, Russia (180 km of the easternmost point)
Southernmost station: Terminal station: Algeciras, Andalusia, Spain (20 kilometers northeast from Punta de Tarifa)
Westernnmost station: Terminal station: Tralee railway station, County Kerry, Ireland (70 km east from The westernmost point of Ireland)

Continental Shengen area
Northernmost station: Terminal station: Narvik, Nordland, Norway
Easternmost station: Stop on the line Joensuu–Kontiomäki: Uimaharju, North Karelia, Finland
Southernmost station: Terminal station: Algeciras, Andalusia, Spain
Westernmost station: Terminal station: Cascais, Lisbon Region, Portugal

See also

Extreme points of Africa-Eurasia
Extreme points of Earth
Extreme points of Eurasia
Extreme points of the European Union
Geographical midpoint of Europe
Geography of Europe
List of highest points of European countries
The world's most northern city, capital, island etc.

Notes

References

External links
 Franz-Joseph-Land, the northernmost islands 
 picture of the westernmost point of Europe

Geography of Europe
Europe
Europe